Elections to East Lothian Council were held on 6 April 1995, the same day as the other Scottish local government elections.

Election results

Ward results

Labour
Musselburgh South
Musselburgh Northwest
Musselburgh Central/Inveresk
Musselburgh East/Pinkie
Prestonpans West/Wallyford
Prestonpans East
Tranent West/Carberry
Tranent East
Ormiston/Pencaitland
Cockenzie and Port Seaton
Longniddry/Macmerry
Haddington West
Haddington Central
Haddington East
Tyninghame
Dunbar

Conservative
Aberlady/Direleton/Gullane
East Linton/Gifford
North Berwick

References

1995 Scottish local elections
1995